The 2017 Belgian Road Cycling Cup (known as the Napoleon Games Cycling Cup for sponsorship reasons) was the second edition of the Belgian Road Cycling Cup. It was won by Jasper De Buyst who overtook Kenny Dehaes in the standings by winning the final race, Binche–Chimay–Binche. Timothy Dupont was the defending champion.

Events
Compared to the initial season, Dwars door West-Vlaanderen was added to the calendar, replacing the Nationale Sluitingsprijs.

Race results
As opposed to the top 20 riders in 2016, the top 15 riders score points for the general classification.

Le Samyn

Dwars door West-Vlaanderen

Handzame Classic

Heistse Pijl

Halle–Ingooigem

Dwars door het Hageland

Final championship standings

Individual

Teams
 won the teams classification by winning two of the races, whereas  won only one.

References

External links
  Official website
  Belgian Cycling Union 2017 Napoleon Games Cycling Cup Standings

Belgian Road Cycling Cup
Belgian Road Cycling Cup
Road Cycling Cup